{|{{Infobox ship begin 
|infobox caption= 
|display title=CIPPB Te Kukupa
}}

|}

Background

When the United Nations Convention on the Laws of the Seas established that all maritime nations exclusive economic zones extended  from their shores, Australia designed and built 22 patrol vessels that it then gave to 12 of its neighbours in the Pacific Forum, so they could exercise sovereignty over their zones, from their own resources.

The replacement is scheduled to be delivered in 2022.

Design

Australia designed these vessels using commercial off-the-shelf equipment, rather than high performance military grade equipment to help ease the maintenance burden of maintaining the vessels in small, remote shipyards. Te Kukupa displaces 160 tons, and is designed to allow its crew to remain at sea for missions of up to ten days.

Operational historyTe Kukupa was delivered in 1989. In 1995 it escorted the vaka Te Au o Tonga to Moruroa to protest against French nuclear testing.

In January 2012 Te Kukupa went to the rescue of the yacht Bonny, only to find it empty, with its lone crew-member missing. It later emerged that the yacht had been stolen by a man facing child sex charges. A member of the Cook Islands Police was later convicted of stealing $9,000 from the yacht.

The vessel underwent a major refit in Australia in 2015.

On November 3, 2017, Te Kukupa rescued the owner of the yacht , whose engines had failed several days earlier.

Replacement

Australia started building a class of replacements for the original Pacific Forum patrol vessels, in 2017. Te Kukupa replacement will be named CIPPB Te Kukupa II. Te Kukupa'' left on her final voyage to Australia on 25 February 2022.

References

Pacific Forum class patrol vessels
1989 ships
Te Kukupa